The Defereggen Valley, or simply Defereggen, is the middle of the three East Tyrolean high mountain valleys running from east to west. Its parallel-running neighbours are the Puster Valley and the Virgen Valley. The Defereggental is linked by a road called the Defereggentalstraße. Its name is derived from the Celtic word dubar (black, dark) or from the Slavic dober (good).

It lies in the High Tauern National Park and is surrounded by the peaks of the Defereggen range, the Rieserferner Group, the Lasörling Group and the Schober Group. The Schwarzach river flows through the valley.
There are three municipalities in the valley: Hopfgarten in Defereggen, St. Veit in Defereggen and St. Jakob in Defereggen.

The Defereggental has been settled since the 7th century by settlers who entered it over the Staller Saddle and the Klammljoch, both crossings into the present day South Tyrol. Even today the South Tyrolese have grazing rights in the upper Defereggental. The main village of St. Jakob im Defereggental is the oldest settlement in East Tyrol. On the other side of the Staller Saddle is the Antholz valley.

In the 17th century about half the population of the Defereggental left the Roman Catholic church and became Protestants. After they refused the Archbishop of Salzburg’s direction to return, in 1684 they were forced to leave the valley. They had to leave their children behind and to sell their property. These emigrants settled mainly in the area of the present-day German states of Bavaria and Baden-Württemberg.

The Defereggental is protected within the Hohe Tauern National Park, and counts as one of the most unspoiled mountain valleys of the Alps. It is ca. 60 km long, and thus one of the longest as well as least populated valleys of the Austrian Alps.

Panorama

References

External links 

 The Defereggental and its municipalities

Valleys of Tyrol (state)
Geography of East Tyrol